There are several different types of rockets. The following articles contain lists of rockets by type:

 List of missiles
 List of orbital launch systems
 List of sounding rockets
 List of military rockets
 List of rocket stages

See also
 Comparison of orbital launch systems
 Comparison of orbital launchers families
 Comparison of space station cargo vehicles
 Comparison of orbital rocket engines
 Comparison of solid-fuelled orbital launch systems
 List of space launch system designs
 List of artillery#Rockets
 List of rocket aircraft
 Lists of weapons
 Model rocket
 NATO reporting name (has lists of various Soviet missiles)

 
Rockets lists